Santa Ana is a town and municipality of the Magdalena Department in northern Colombia. Founded in 1751 by José Fernando de Mier y Guerra with the name of Santa Ana de Buena Vista. In 1918 was established as a municipality.

Politics

Administrative divisions

Corregimientos

Barro Blanco
San Fernando
Jaraba
Santa Rosa

References

External links
 Santa Ana official website
 Gobernacion del Magdalena - Corregimientos; Santa Ana

Municipalities of Magdalena Department
Populated places established in 1751
1750s establishments in the Viceroyalty of New Granada
1751 establishments in South America